Chloroclystis pitoi is a moth in the family Geometridae. It is found on Rapa Island.

References

External links

Moths described in 1971
pitoi